The Hutt Expressway (often erroneously referred to as the Hutt Motorway) is a 3-4 lane divided highway running from the Wellington Urban Motorway at Ngauranga, past Lower Hutt and central Upper Hutt, to the intersection with Fergusson Drive in Maoribank in north-eastern Upper Hutt. State Highway 2 officially continues north of Maoribank to Te Mārua, Kaitoke, and over the Rimutaka Hill to Wairarapa, but this section is two lanes undivided and is covered in the main State Highway 2 article. The names Hutt Expressway and Hutt Motorway are not official, and actually refers to three different roads: Hutt Road from the Ngauranga Interchange to the Petone Overbridge, Western Hutt Road from the Petone Overbridge to the Silverstream Bridge, and River Road from Silverstream Bridge to Maoribank.

Design
South of the Silverstream Bridge intersection the road is mainly two lanes each way, with a three-lane northbound section just south of the Belmont Hills intersection, and is dual carriageway throughout. North of the Silverstream Bridge intersection, the road is dual carriageway as far as Gibbons Street, except for a small section on the Moonshine Bridge across the Hutt River, with the Gibbons Street to Maoribank section being single carriageway. Except for the Moonshine Bridge and Totara Park to Maoribank section, the road has three lanes in total: two in one direction and one in the other, alternating every kilometre (a 2+1 road)

Improvements
The section between the Petone and Normandale Overbridges was improved by the Dowse to Petone project, replacing three sets of traffic lights with a grade-separated roundabout and an overbridge.

The grade-separation of the SH 58 intersection at Haywards was opened in 2017, converting the traffic light controlled intersection with a grade separated roundabout interchange. There are proposals to replace the Melling intersection with a grade-separated interchange also. Future plans also exist to grade separate the intersections at Fairway Drive (Kennedy Good Bridge) and at Silverstream (Fergusson Drive).

Interchanges

All interchanges are at-grade unless otherwise specified. At-grade intersections are controlled by traffic lights, with minor ones controlled by Give Way and Stop signs.  Several minor intersections were changed to prevent traffic turning right into or out of minor roads. The Haywards (SH 58), Dowse Drive, Petone, and Ngauranga interchanges are grade-separated.

Notes

See also
List of motorways and expressways in New Zealand

References

Roads in New Zealand
Transport in Wellington
Wellington City
Lower Hutt
Hutt Valley